Ashby is a 2015 American crime comedy-drama film written and directed by Tony McNamara. The film stars Mickey Rourke, Nat Wolff, Emma Roberts, and Sarah Silverman. The film  had its world premiere at Tribeca Film Festival on April 19, 2015. The film was released in the United States in a limited release and on video on demand on September 25, 2015, by Paramount Pictures and The Film Arcade.

Plot

High-school nerd Ed Wallis (Nat Wolff) enters into a friendship with his neighbor, Ashby (Mickey Rourke), a retired CIA assassin who only has a few months to live.
The film is a coming of age/approaching death comedy drama.

Ashby initially tells Ed that he is a retired napkin salesman. Ed realizes he's more than that when he finds multiple passports with Ashby's photo, and cupboards full of weapons.

Cast

Production
In June 2014, a casting call was held for extras. On June 27, 2014 as the production began on the film, more actors joined the film which include Michael Lerner, Kevin Dunn and Zachary Knighton.

Filming
Set in Virginia, the principal photography on the film began on June 22, 2014 in Charlotte, North Carolina and lasted for five weeks. On June 23, filming took place in Matthews, North Carolina. Almost 500 extras filled the football stadium at South Mecklenburg High School to film game scenes.

Music
In October 2014, Alec Puro was hired to compose the music for the film.

Release
The film had its world premiere at the Tribeca Film Festival on April 19, 2015. In May 2015, it was announced Paramount Pictures had acquired international distribution rights involving United States, Canada, United Kingdom, Australia, Germany, New Zealand and Switzerland. That same day, it was announced the film would receive an on-demand and theatrical release in fall of 2015. Paramount teamed up with The Film Arcade for U.S theatrical distribution. The film was released in a limited release and through video on demand on September 25, 2015.

Critical response
Ashby received mixed reviews from film critics. On Rotten Tomatoes it has an approval rating of 52%, based on 21 reviews, with an average rating of 5.51/10. On Metacritic, the film holds a rating of 46 out of 100, based on 8 critics, indicating "mixed or average reviews".

Dennis Harvey of Variety gave the film a mixed review, writing: "Starring Mickey Rourke as a retired CIA assassin turned improbable mentor to Nat Wolff's next-door-neighbor misfit, 'Ashby' is a genre jumble that makes half-baked use of high-school sports, crime comedy, teen romance and other formulae to mildly diverting ends that are never quite convincing or funny enough. Paramount launched a limited theatrical rollout on Sept. 25, simultaneous with on-demand availability, but Aussie tube scribe Tony McNamara's U.S. feature will definitely fare best as a viable if innocuous cable/rental time-filler."

Kate Erbland of The Playlist for Indiewire.com also gave the film a mixed review, writing : "It's inevitable that 'Ashby' will squish together its two most important plots — Ashby's mysterious quest and Ed's attempts to be a football star — but McNamara attempts to keep the movie ticking right along, and for all its half-cocked plotlines, 'Ashby' is able to maintain a consistently humorous and light tone. Ed and Ashby's worldview is more than a bit skewed, but so is the film's, and it works well enough to keep the film entertaining and bouncy."

Box office
The film was released on video on demand, as well as opening in 15 theaters, the film debuted with a poor weekend total of $4,631, with a per-theater average of $309.

References

External links
 

2015 films
2015 comedy-drama films
2010s coming-of-age comedy-drama films
2010s high school films
American coming-of-age comedy-drama films
Films set in Virginia
Films shot in North Carolina
High school football films
Paramount Pictures films
2010s English-language films
2010s American films